Paramjit Singh (born 1935) is an Indian artist. He was born in Amritsar, India. Currently he lives in New Delhi, India. Singh is married to fellow painter Arpita Singh, with whom he had a daughter, the artist Anjum Singh.

He earned his Bachelors and PhD in Fine Arts from Delhi Polytechnic in 1958 and 1962, respectively. For nearly three decades Singh was a Professor in the Department of Fine Arts at Jamia Millia Islamia in New Delhi.

The Seventh Walk (2013), an experimental documentary film by Indian filmmaker Amit Dutta explores the charcoal drawings of Singh.

Selected exhibitions
2014: Talwar Gallery, Shifting Terrains, New York, NY, US
2013: Lalit Kala Academy Galleries, The Drawing Wall, New Delhi, India
2011: India Habitat Centre, The Lost Sparrow, New Delhi, India
2010: Vadehra Art Gallery, Beauty & Loss – A Landscape Diary, New Delhi, India
2009: Center for International Modern Art, Shall Return Again..., Calcutta, India
2005: Sakshi Gallery, Mumbai, India
2004: Talwar Gallery, New York, NY, US
2002: Talwar Gallery, Rajendra Dhawan and Paramjit Singh: Inner/Outer, New York, NY, US
1996: Gallery Chemould, Bombay, India
1995: Vadhera Gallery, New Delhi, India

References

External links
Next Projection, "MoMA Documentary Fortnight 2014 Review: The Seventh Walk (2013)," February 2014.
Nature's Labyrinth, "Conversation with Paramjit Singh," 2007. 

1935 births
Living people
Indian contemporary painters
Artists from Amritsar
Indian male painters
20th-century Indian painters
Painters from Rajasthan
20th-century Indian male artists
21st-century Indian male artists